Gilles Floro (born in Guadeloupe April 18, 1964 – died in Gourbeyre, Guadeloupe June 22, 1999), was a popular French Antillean zouk love singer.

References 
Allmusic

External links 

Discography

1999 deaths
1964 births
20th-century French male singers